Mielno  ( or ) is a resort town in Koszalin County, West Pomeranian Voivodeship, in north-western Poland. It is the seat of the gmina (administrative district) called Gmina Mielno. The town has a population of 3,200.

Mielno is a well-known tourist destination with sandy beaches on the Baltic Sea coast. It lies on a spit between the sea and the large Jamno lake. It is contiguous with the neighbouring resort of Unieście.

Nuclear power plant controversy

The nearby village of Gąski is one of three sites selected by Polish power company PGE in November 2011 to host a nuclear power station with a capacity of 3 gigawatts. In February 2012, residents voted overwhelmingly against the plan. Some 94 percent of the 2,389 people who took part in a referendum opposed the plant and only 5 percent supported it.

Notable people 
 Reni Jusis (born 1974 in Konin, raised in Mielno) is a female Polish pop singer, songwriter and producer.

Gallery

References

Cities and towns in West Pomeranian Voivodeship
Coastal cities and towns in Poland
Koszalin County
Seaside resorts in Poland